Leon of Paionia (Greek: Λέων), (278 BC – 250 BC) was an ancient Paeonian king, father of Dropion.

References

Paeonian kings
270s BC births
250s BC deaths
3rd-century BC rulers